Zhanhua is a district of Binzhou, Shandong province, People's Republic of China. It was a county until 2014.

The population in 1999 was 381,416.

Administrative divisions
As 2012, this District is divided to 2 subdistricts, 5 towns and 5 townships.

Subdistricts
 Fuguo Subdistrict
 Fuyuan Subdistrict

Towns

Townships

Climate

References

External links
 Official site

County-level divisions of Shandong